Push Me Pull You is a 2016 video game. It may also refer to:

 Pushmi-Pullyu, a character from the children's book series Doctor Dolittle
 Push Me, Pull You (Thomas & Friends), a 2008 episode from the children's television series Thomas & Friends